Cho Yoon-jeong (born 2 April 1979) is a South Korean former tennis player.

In her career, she won one doubles title on the WTA Tour, at Seoul in 2004. Her best Grand Slam performance came when she made the third round of the 2005 US Open by defeating Arantxa Parra Santonja in three sets in the first round, upsetting the 27th seed Gisela Dulko in the second round, before she fell to No. 7, Justine Henin. She reached career-high WTA rankings of No. 45 in singles (in July 2003), and No. 98 in doubles (in September 2003).

Yoon-jeong retired from professional tennis in 2008.

WTA career finals

Singles: 3 (3 runner-ups)

Doubles: 2 (1 title, 1 runner-up)

ITF Circuit finals

Singles: 13 (5–8)

Doubles: 16 (10–6)

External links
 
 
 

1979 births
Living people
South Korean female tennis players
People from Andong
Sportspeople from North Gyeongsang Province
Asian Games medalists in tennis
Olympic tennis players of South Korea
Tennis players at the 2000 Summer Olympics
Tennis players at the 2004 Summer Olympics
Tennis players at the 1998 Asian Games
Tennis players at the 2002 Asian Games
Universiade medalists in tennis
Medalists at the 1998 Asian Games
Medalists at the 2002 Asian Games
Asian Games silver medalists for South Korea
Asian Games bronze medalists for South Korea
Universiade silver medalists for South Korea
Medalists at the 2005 Summer Universiade
21st-century South Korean women